Sue Moore may refer to:

Sue Moore (actress) in Tiny Troubles
Sue Moore (scientist) marine mammal scientist 
Sue Moore, Mayor of Singleton Council

See also
Susan Moore (disambiguation)
Suzanne Moore, journalist
Destiney Sue Moore